Harvey M. Sussman is an American linguist and professor of linguistics at University of Texas at Austin. He is known for his research on speech production, speech perception, language and the brain, and neurolinguistics. Sussman has received the Editors' Award (from the Journal of Speech & Hearing Research), Teaching Excellence award and College of Communication Research Award.

References

External links
Sussman at University of Texas at Austin

Phoneticians
University of Wisconsin–Madison alumni
University of Texas at Austin faculty
Living people
Communication scholars
Linguists from the United States
American phonologists
Queens College, City University of New York alumni
Year of birth missing (living people)